The red complex is a group of bacteria that are categorized together based on their association with severe forms of periodontal disease. The red complex—among a number of other complexes—were classified by Sigmund Socransky in 1998.

The three members of the red complex are:
 Porphyromonas gingivalis
 Tannerella forsythia
 Treponema denticola

References 

Periodontology